The 2021 Road to the Kentucky Oaks is a points system by which Thoroughbred fillies qualified for the 2021 Kentucky Oaks held on April 30. The field for the Kentucky Oaks, the filly equivalent of the Kentucky Derby, is limited to fourteen horses, with up to four "also eligible" horses in case of a late withdrawal from the field. The 30 races in the Road to the Kentucky Oaks were held from September 2020 (when the fillies were age two) through April 2021 (when they had turned three). The top four finishers in the specified races earn points, with the highest point values awarded in the major preparatory races held in late March and early April. Earnings in non-restricted stakes act as a tie breaker.

Fillies who instead wish to enter the Kentucky Derby have to earn the necessary points in the races on the Road to the Kentucky Derby: points earned on the Road to the Kentucky Oaks are not transferable. However, if a filly does earn qualifying points for the Derby by racing in open company, those points also count towards qualifying for the Oaks.

The 2020 Road to the Kentucky Oaks suffered major disruptions due to the COVID-19 pandemic, which led to the postponement of the 2020 Oaks itself to September. For 2021, the Road to the Kentucky Oaks instead reverted to schedule for the 2019 Road to the Kentucky Oaks, except as follows:
 the Cincinnati Trophy, added as part of the 2020 Road, was retained for 2021
 Points for the Bourbonette Oaks were increased from 20 for first place to 50
 the Sunland Park Oaks was not held because of the cancellation of the Sunland Park race meeting due to the COVID-19 pandemic

For the first time, points will not be awarded to horses that have been administered furosemide (Lasix) on race day.

Standings
The following table shows the points earned in the eligible races. Entries were taken on April 27. 

 Entrants for Kentucky Oaks in pink
 Did not qualify/Not nomininated/Injured/Bypassing the race in gray-->

Race results

Prep season

Championship Series

See also
2021 Road to the Kentucky Derby

Notes

References

Kentucky Oaks
Road to the Kentucky Oaks
Road to the Kentucky Oaks